Chynorany is a village and municipality in Partizánske District in the Trenčín Region of western Slovakia.

The village is located on the right bank of the river Nitra, approximately in the middle between the towns of Partizánske and Topoľčany. Northwest the terrain curves into the Bojice hillside, following the mountain range of Považský Inovec. To the south and east, behind the river Nitra, rises the mountain range of Tribeč.

Partizánske is 10 km northeast, Topoľčany 12 km southwest and Bánovce nad Bebravou 15 km north from Chynorany.

Etymology
The name is derived from a duty to guard a local ford at early morning.  – to pretend, to lie (here also ambush, the word is preserved e.g. in Serbian as hiniti), ran-, raný, ranný – early, morning.

History
In historical records, the village was first mentioned in 1243.

Geography
It has a population of about 2723 people.

See also
 List of municipalities and towns in Slovakia

References

Genealogical resources

The records for genealogical research are available at the state archive "Statny Archiv in Nitra, Slovakia"

 Roman Catholic church records (births/marriages/deaths): 1707–1946 (parish A)

External links

  Official page
https://web.archive.org/web/20160402002416/http://chynorany.e-obce.sk/
Surnames of living people in Chynorany

Villages and municipalities in Partizánske District